The Line Islands, Teraina Islands or Equatorial Islands (in Gilbertese, Aono Raina) are a chain of 11 atolls (with partly or fully enclosed lagoons) and coral islands (with a surrounding reef) in the central Pacific Ocean, south of the Hawaiian Islands. The island chain stretches northwest to southeast across , making it one of the longest island chains in the world. It lies at the geographic center of the Pacific Ocean, near Starbuck Island. One of the atolls in the group, Kiritimati, has the largest land area of any atoll in the world. Of the 11 atolls, all of which were formed by volcanic activity, only the Kiritimati and Tabuaeran atolls and Teraina island have a permanent population (one of the reefs, Filippo Reef, is shown on some maps, but its existence is doubted). Eight of the atolls are parts of Kiribati. The remaining three—Jarvis Island, Kingman Reef (which is largely submerged), and Palmyra Atoll—are territories of the United States grouped with the United States Minor Outlying Islands.

The International Date Line passes through the Line Islands. The ones that are parts of Kiribati are in the world's farthest forward time zone, UTC+14:00. The time of day is (UTC-10.00), the same as in the state of Hawaii in the United States, but the date is one day ahead of Hawaii. The time in the Line Islands is 26 hours ahead of some other islands in Oceania, such as Baker Island, which uses UTC−12:00.

Overview
Copra and pet fish are the islands' main export products (along with seaweed).

Archaeologists have identified the remains of coral Marae platforms and/or village complexes on several of the islands, including the Kiritimati and Tabuaeran atolls, Teraina Island, Malden, Millennium Atoll and Flint Island. These remains are dateable as far back as the 14th century, and show that the inhabitants of the Line Islands were more than just castaways.

Most 18th-century visitors to these isles overlooked these telltale signs of former Polynesian settlement. This included Captain Cook, who landed on Christmas Island in 1777, as well as Captain Fanning, who visited Teraina (Washington Island) and Tabuaeran (Fanning Atoll) in 1798.

In the 19th century, whaling ships were regular visitors to the islands. They came in search of water, wood and provisions. The first whaler recorded to have visited one of them was the Coquette, which docked at Kiritimati (then called Christmas Island) in 1822.

In 1888, the United Kingdom was planning to lay the Pacific cable, and annexed the islands with a view to using Tabuaeran (then Fanning Island) as one of the relay stations for the cable. The cable was laid and was operational between 1902 and 1963 (except for a short period in 1914).

In 1916, the British annexed Fanning and Washington islands, making them part of the British colony of the Gilbert and Ellice Islands. In 1919, they annexed Christmas Island to the same colony. The Line Islands occasionally featured briefly in the biennial reports furnished by the Colony's resident commissioner to the Colonial Office and Parliament in London (see, for example, the reports submitted in 1966 and 1967).

The United States contested the British annexations, based on the U.S. Guano Islands Act of 1856, which allowed for very wide-ranging territorial claims. It relinquished these claims only in 1979, when it entered into the Treaty of Tarawa, which recognised Kiribati's sovereignty over the majority of the Line Islands chain.

List of atolls, islands and reefs
Geographically, the Line Islands is divided into three subgroups: the Northern, Central, and Southern Line Islands (however, the Central Line Islands are sometimes grouped with the Southern Line Islands). The table below lists the islands from north to south.

Note:

*The lagoon areas marked with an asterisk are included in the land areas of the previous column because, unlike typical lagoons in atolls, they are inland waters completely sealed off from the sea.

Time zone realignment

On 23 December 1994, the Republic of Kiribati announced a change of time zone for the Line Islands, to take effect 31 December 1994. Millennium Island is now at the same time as the Hawaiian Islands (Hawaii–Aleutian Time Zone), but one day ahead. This move made Millennium Island (then Caroline Island) the easternmost land in the earliest time zone (by some definitions, the easternmost point on Earth), and one of the first points of land which saw sunrise on 1 January 2000 – at 5:43 am, as measured by local time.

The stated reason for the move was the fulfilment of a campaign promise that Kiribati President Teburoro Tito had made to eliminate the confusion caused by Kiribati straddling the Date Line and therefore being constantly in two different days. However, Kiribati officials were not reluctant to attempt to capitalise on the nation's new status as owners of the first land to see sunrise in 2000. Other Pacific nations, including Tonga and New Zealand's Chatham Islands, protested the move, objecting that it interfered with their own claims to be the first land to see dawn in the year 2000.

In 1999, to further capitalise upon the massive public interest in celebrations marking the arrival of the year 2000, Caroline Island was officially renamed Millennium Island. Although the island is uninhabited, a special celebration was held there to mark the occasion. It featured performances by native Kiribati entertainers and was attended by Kiribati's President Tito. Over 70 Kiribati singers and dancers travelled to Millennium Island from the capital, South Tarawa, accompanied by approximately 25 journalists. The celebration, which was broadcast worldwide by satellite, had an estimated audience size of as many as one billion viewers.

See also

 List of islands in the Pacific Ocean
 Polynesian Triangle

References

External links
 
 National Geographic – Southern Line Islands Expedition, 2009

 
Archipelagoes of the Pacific Ocean
Atolls of the Pacific Ocean
Disputed islands
Divided regions
Geography of Micronesia
Pacific islands claimed under the Guano Islands Act
Islands of Oceania
Archipelagoes of the United States
Eastern Indo-Pacific
Marine ecoregions